Kassoum is a given name. Notable people with the name include:

Kassoum Denon, Malian politician
Kassoum Ouédraogo (born 1966), Burkinabé footballer

African given names